Harald Nævdal (born 6 July 1970), known by his stage name Demonaz Doom Occulta, or simply Demonaz, is a Norwegian musician best known as the founding guitarist and chief lyricist for the black metal band Immortal.

Career
In Immortal, he is known for his lyrics which, unconventionally for black metal, focus on icy landscapes and a fictional land called Blashyrkh. The story of Blashyrkh is gradually told throughout Immortal's albums. When writing lyrics he often takes long walks in the Norwegian countryside near his hometown of Bergen for inspiration. He was known for his simplistic but extremely fast guitar parts which always featured power chords. He and frontman Abbath comprised the core of Immortal in its early years, with other members fluctuating and little stability until drummer Horgh joined the band in 1997.

Demonaz played guitar on the albums Diabolical Fullmoon Mysticism, Pure Holocaust and Battles in the North, with his last musical contribution to Immortal being the 1997 album Blizzard Beasts. That same year, he was diagnosed with acute tendinopathy and could no longer play guitar at the speed required for Immortal. Instead, he continued to write lyrics for the band and often took the role of manager. He often accompanied the band on tour and was still seen by Abbath, Horgh and Apollyon as a member of the band. After having surgery to correct his tendinitis in 2013, he was able to play guitar again and has returned to that role in the band since Abbath's departure.

Demonaz has appeared in all of Immortal's music videos, including the music video for All Shall Fall, which was released in September 2010.

Demonaz has started a band called Demonaz where he is the vocalist. The band also includes most of the members of the band I. He wrote the lyrics for the I album Between Two Worlds. He has released his debut album, March of the Norse, in April/May 2011.

On 31 May 2016, according to Immortal's official Facebook page, Demonaz was officially announced as the band's new lead singer following the departure of Abbath in 2015.

Discography

With Immortal

Played on 
 Diabolical Fullmoon Mysticism (1992) - guitar
 Pure Holocaust (1993) - guitar
 Battles in the North (1995) - guitar
 Blizzard Beasts (1997) - guitar
 Northern Chaos Gods (2018) - vocals, guitar

Lyrics only 
 At the Heart of Winter (1999)
 Damned in Black (2000)
 Sons of Northern Darkness (2002)
 All Shall Fall (2009)

Solo 

 Demo (2007)
 March of the Norse (2011)

With I 

 Between Two Worlds (2006)

With Amputation 

 Achieve The Mutilation (Demo) (1989)
 Slaughtered in the arms of God (Demo) (1990)

External links
 Official website of Immortal
 Interview with Demonaz

1970 births
Living people
Norwegian black metal musicians
Norwegian heavy metal guitarists
Black metal guitarists
Norwegian songwriters
Musicians from Bergen
Demonaz
Immortal (band) members
Old Funeral members
21st-century Norwegian guitarists